"Catch Me Outside" is a song by American rapper Ski Mask the Slump God, released on June 13, 2017 as the third single from his second mixtape You Will Regret (2017). The song is a freestyle over "She's a Bitch" by Missy Elliott, produced by Timbaland.

Composition
In the song, Ski Mask the Slump God performs a freestyle rap over the instrumental of "She's a Bitch", while "filling every nook and cranny with his stacked rhymes" and making pop cultural references. Mitch Findlay of HotNewHipHop described the song as showing a more playful side of Ski Mask.

Music video
The official music video, directed by Cole Bennett, was released on July 27, 2017. It sees Ski Mask the Slump God walking through Times Square, drinking lean and sticking his head out through a window of a car. Psychedelic animation is featured throughout the video, representing Ski Mask's hallucinations. A doll resembling Chucky from Child's Play appears in the video, seen sitting in the center of Times Square and traveling with Ski.

Reception
Missy Elliott responded positively to the song, writing on Twitter, "Oh he rode the heck out of this Fiyah[!]"

Certifications

References

2017 singles
2017 songs
Ski Mask the Slump God songs
Songs written by Missy Elliott
Songs written by Timbaland
Song recordings produced by Timbaland
Music videos directed by Cole Bennett
Republic Records singles